The Jezreel subdistrict is one of Israel's sub-districts in Northern District. The subdistrict consists of the merger of the two Mandatory Palestine subdistricts of Beisan (Beit Shan) and Nazareth.

References